Inch is a small village in County Cork, Ireland approximately  north of the village of Killeagh.

The Roman Catholic church in Inch serves Killeagh and Inch Parish and is dedicated to Saint Patrick. It was built c.1870.

References

Towns and villages in County Cork